Gerhard Johann von Löwenwolde (Гергард Иоганн Левенвольде, died 1721) was a Baltic German Estonian knight. In the 1690s, he announced support of Johann Reinhold von Patkul's lobbyism against Swedish absolutist threats to Baltic noble privileges, while also working with the Swedish authorities in Estonia. He served in the Swedish army, and in 1697 was promoted major of the Swedish garrison in Riga. During the Great Northern War, he first served Augustus the Strong of Saxe-Poland–Lithuania, and after taking an ambiguous stance towards August and Peter the Great of Russia entered Peter's service after the Capitulation of Estonia and Livonia in 1710. He served as Peter the Great's plenipotentiary of Livonia during the same year, and held that office until 1713, when he became hofmeister in the service of Princess Charlotte of Brunswick-Wolfenbüttel, wife of Peter's son Alexei Petrovich, Tsarevich of Russia.

With Magdalene Elisabeth von Löwen he had the following children:
Charlotte
Karl Gustav von Löwenwolde
Gustav Reinhold von Löwenwolde
Friedrich Casimir von Löwenwolde

Sources

References

Bibliography

Great Northern War
Baltic-German people
Russian nobility
Swedish nobility
17th-century births
1721 deaths
Privy Councillor (Russian Empire)